The Cavone (in its upper course: Salandrella) is a river in the Basilicata region of southern Italy. Its source is west of Accettura in the province of Matera near the border with the province of Potenza. The river flows northeast near Oliveto Lucano and Garaguso before curving southeast. It flows near Salandra and San Mauro Forte before being joined by a right tributary. The river is joined by a left tributary north of Craco. It flows southeast near Pisticci and empties into the Gulf of Taranto.

References

Rivers of the Province of Matera
Rivers of Italy
Drainage basins of the Ionian Sea